Lightweight Java (LJ) is a fully formalized and extensible minimal imperative fragment of Java. The language was designed for academic purposes within the Computer Laboratory, University of Cambridge. The definition of LJ was proven type-sound in Isabelle/HOL.

See also 

 Lightweight programming language

References

Java (programming language)
C programming language family
Class-based programming languages
Object-oriented programming languages